The PRR E44 was an electric, rectifier-equipped locomotive built by General Electric for the Pennsylvania Railroad between 1960 and 1963. The PRR used them for freight service on the Northeast Corridor. They continued in service under Penn Central and Conrail until Conrail abandoned its electric operations in the early 1980s. They were then acquired by Amtrak and NJ Transit, where they lived short lives; all were retired by the mid-1980s. One is preserved at the Railroad Museum of Pennsylvania.

Design
By the late 1950s, with its P5a fleet aging, the Pennsylvania Railroad needed new electric freight locomotives. In fact, the PRR had never really had a successful electric freight locomotive. The P5a was originally built to haul passengers, being bumped from that duty by the more powerful GG1. The GG1s were best at hauling passenger trains; while also adequate for fast, time-sensitive freights, they were not as efficient on heavy freights (especially coal and ore trains) at a time before roller bearings were widely used on freight cars. The PRR had purchased E2b, E2c and E3b demonstrators, but was not particularly impressed, for a variety of reasons. The railroad even considered complete freight dieselization, and commissioned studies on this from builders Alco, GM's EMD and General Electric; however, all three builders recommended retaining all existing electrification and acquiring new electric locomotives. The PRR took special note of twelve state-of-the-art EL-C electrics built by GE for the Virginian Railway, which was satisfied by their performance on their coal trains in the Blue Ridge Mountains. The PRR then approached GE about building a similar locomotive, resulting in an order for 66 such units in 1959.

The E44 was essentially a more powerful version of the EL-C (later known as the E33), with  compared to the EL-C's . One of the most notable differences in appearances between the two locomotives was the pantograph(s): the El-C had one double-arm (Stemmann) pantograph, whereas the E44 had two single-arm (Faiveley) pantographs: a characteristic born of the PRR's operating practice of having two pantographs per locomotive. The EL-C, while of utilitarian design, also had a slightly more-rounded appearance than the rather-boxier E44. While the E44 was short on aesthetics compared with the GG1 and P5 ("bricks" being a particularly common sobriquet), the units were long on performance.

General Electric constructed the first 60 E44s (4400-4459) using Ignitron rectifiers, and the final six units (4460-4465) with air-cooled silicon diode rectifiers. GE subsequently upgraded 22 of the units (a few at a time) to an E44a designation, boasting upgraded traction motors and silicon rectifier packages for an output of 5,000 horsepower.  The 22 E44a's were numbered ; the E44a program was terminated in 1970 due to the Penn Central bankruptcy. Conrail subsequently swapped out the Ignitrons in all of the remaining units for silicon diodes in the late 1970s and early 1980s, in-house and without any horsepower upgrades. In 1980, GE took E44a 4453 in hand for rebuilding with upgraded electronics and uprating to 6,000 horsepower. Made redundant by Conrail's discontinuance of electrified freight operations, the rebuilt 4453 was briefly tested on the Northeast Corridor in 1984 by GE, which then scrapped the unit several years later after salvaging the newer components.

In the late 1960s, General Electric constructed two upgraded 5,000 horsepower (25,000 volt, 60 cycle) units of the same E44 body style (known as E50Cs) for the Muskingum Electric Railroad, a private coal-carrying railroad owned by American Electric Power. Until it closed in 2002, MERR shuttled coal in two automated consists from the mine to a powerplant at Relief, Ohio (across from Beverly, OH).

History

Pennsylvania Railroad
The Pennsylvania took delivery of 66 E44s between 1960–63 and they quickly displaced the P5s. The Pennsylvania used the E44s on just about any freight assignment imaginable, on all of its electrified lines. They could work both singly or lashed together as multiple units. They quickly proved to be very versatile and could handle just about any train, without helpers. The E44's dynamic braking, a novelty under PRR wires, made them just as sure-footed descending grades as climbing them (although the brakes were not regenerative).

The units were delivered in an entirely new paint scheme. While adorned in the familiar PRR Brunswick Green, the units carried the sans-serif road name in yellow, flanked by two small PRR keystones, together with a keystone on the front and rear, and a large yellow road number. This scheme was unique to the E44; all subsequent diesel orders omitted the road name. The impact of the lettering was diminished by the fact that the units were seldom washed and became very grimy, due to the assignment of the units to diesel service facilities whose automatic car washers lacked overhead wiring.

Penn Central and Conrail

After the 1968 Penn Central merger, the E44s remained in freight service, over the same territory as before, and (unlike much of the Penn Central diesel fleet), as reliably as before. The paint scheme for most units was Penn Central black with the "worms in love" logo. At least one unit wore the short-lived "red-P" logo, with the 'P' in the logo red instead of white. Not all units received a full Penn Central paint scheme, mainly due to the cash-strapped nature of the railroad, which went bankrupt in June 1970. For example, some had white PC numbers and small "worms" on the ends, while a few never received any new lettering at all, instead having all their PRR markings simply patch-painted over except for their yellow numbers.

In 1976, they were passed to the newly formed Conrail. However, things changed when Conrail eliminated their electrification in 1981. All 66 E44s were retired at that time, though some units were already stored due to economic downturn; no unit had ever been retired or seriously wrecked. Most, though not all, of the E44s got to be repainted blue with Conrail's white "wheel on rail" logo.

Amtrak and NJ Transit
Despite their versatility, the E44's were suddenly about to be used in something they were never intended for: passenger service. Amtrak and New Jersey Transit, both short of electric locomotives, saw in the E44's an opportunity to obtain needed power at bargain-basement prices.

Amtrak painted them in its standard switcher paint (gray body with black lettering), and switching work was mostly what they ended up doing. They did this adeptly for some years, until Amtrak decided maintaining these aging locomotives was not worth it. The PCB-laden coolant in their transformers also cut short their lives. Many were stored at Wilmington Shops in Wilmington, DE during the early to mid-1990 and they were eventually scrapped.

It is not certain what exactly NJ Transit was looking for, but it evidently was not the E44. All were sold to Amtrak. Like many of NJ Transit's second-hand locomotives, their paint scheme was the previous owner (Conrail)'s herald being painted out, and "NJDOT" (New Jersey Department of Transportation) written below the number.

Preservation
PRR  4465, the final production E44, is preserved at the Railroad Museum of Pennsylvania. 4465 was completed in July 1963, and later saw service with Amtrak as No. 502.

Notes

References

Further reading
 

11 kV AC locomotives
E44
General Electric locomotives
C-C locomotives
Electric locomotives of the United States
Preserved electric locomotives
Freight locomotives
Conrail locomotives
Amtrak locomotives
Standard gauge locomotives of the United States